Shin Seung-chan (신승찬; ; born 6 December 1994) is a South Korean doubles specialist badminton player. She won the women's doubles bronze medals at the 2016 Summer Olympics, and 2014 BWF World Championships. Shin clinched the women's and mixed doubles gold at the 2015 Summer Universiade, also in the team event in 2013 and 2015.

Achievements

Olympic Games 
Women's doubles

BWF World Championships 
Women's doubles

Summer Universiade 
Women's doubles

Mixed doubles

BWF World Junior Championships 
Girls' doubles

Asian Junior Championships 
Girls' doubles

BWF World Tour (4 titles, 8 runners-up) 
The BWF World Tour, which was announced on 19 March 2017 and implemented in 2018, is a series of elite badminton tournaments, sanctioned by Badminton World Federation (BWF). The BWF World Tour is divided into six levels, namely World Tour Finals, Super 1000, Super 750, Super 500, Super 300 (part of the HSBC World Tour), and the BWF Tour Super 100.

Women's doubles

Mixed doubles

BWF Superseries (3 titles, 3 runners-up) 
The BWF Superseries, which was launched on 14 December 2006 and implemented in 2007, was a series of elite badminton tournaments, sanctioned by the Badminton World Federation (BWF). BWF Superseries levels were Superseries and Superseries Premier. A season of Superseries consisted of twelve tournaments around the world that had been introduced since 2011. Successful players were invited to the Superseries Finals, which were held at the end of each year.

Women's doubles

 BWF Superseries Finals tournament
 BWF Superseries Premier tournament
 BWF Superseries tournament

BWF Grand Prix (9 titles, 5 runners-up) 
The BWF Grand Prix had two levels, the Grand Prix and Grand Prix Gold. It was a series of badminton tournaments sanctioned by the Badminton World Federation (BWF) and played between 2007 and 2017.

Women's doubles

Mixed doubles

 BWF Grand Prix Gold tournament
 BWF Grand Prix tournament

BWF International Challenge/Series (2 titles) 
Women's doubles

 BWF International Challenge tournament
 BWF International Series tournament

References

External links 
 
 

1994 births
Living people
Sportspeople from North Jeolla Province
South Korean female badminton players
Badminton players at the 2016 Summer Olympics
Badminton players at the 2020 Summer Olympics
Olympic badminton players of South Korea
Olympic bronze medalists for South Korea
Olympic medalists in badminton
Medalists at the 2016 Summer Olympics
Badminton players at the 2018 Asian Games
Asian Games competitors for South Korea
Universiade gold medalists for South Korea
Universiade bronze medalists for South Korea
Universiade medalists in badminton
Medalists at the 2013 Summer Universiade
Medalists at the 2015 Summer Universiade
21st-century South Korean women